Wemyss Mackenzie (McKenzie) Simpson (March 30, 1824 – March 31, 1894) was a Canadian fur trader and political figure. He represented Algoma in the House of Commons of Canada as a Conservative member from 1867 to 1871.

He was born in London, England in 1824, the son of Geddes Mackenzie Simpson. He studied at Eton College and came to Lower Canada in 1841 as an employee of the Hudson's Bay Company. Simpson served with the company until 1864, serving as the last factor for the post at Sault Ste. Marie, where he settled after his retirement. His cousin, George Simpson, was a governor of the Hudson's Bay Company. In 1870, Simpson acted as guide and interpreter for the Red River Expeditionary Force. In 1871, he was named Indian Commissioner for Rupert's Land and resigned from his seat in the House of Commons. Later that same year, he arranged Treaties 1 and 2 with the Ojibwa and Swampy Cree Nations in southern Manitoba.

Simpson was married twice: to Annie Ironside in 1853 and later to Eliza Ironside, her sister. He died at Fort Monroe, Virginia in 1894.

Electoral record

References

External links 
 

1824 births
1894 deaths
People educated at Eton College
Conservative Party of Canada (1867–1942) MPs
Members of the House of Commons of Canada from Ontario
Canadian fur traders
Numbered Treaties